This is a list of mayors and the later lord mayors of the city of Newcastle-upon-Tyne in the United Kingdom.

Newcastle had elected a mayor annually since 1216. The city was awarded the dignity of a lord mayoralty by letters patent dated 27 July 1906. The grant was announced by Edward VII on a visit to the city on 12 July, having been approved by the Home Office as Newcastle was "the chief town and seaport of the North of England". When the city became a metropolitan borough in 1974 the honour was confirmed by letters patent dated 1 April 1974. 

The office of Sheriff of Newcastle upon Tyne existed from 1400 to 1974 and was reintroduced in 1996 as a position held by the Deputy Lord Mayor.

Key

Mayors and Lord Mayors of Newcastle
Source:

References

Source
 

Newcastle, Lord Mayors of the City of
 
Lord Mayors
Lord Mayors